Democratic Liberal Party may refer to:

Current parties with that name include:
Armenian Democratic Liberal Party
Democratic Liberal Party (Armenia)

Defunct parties of the name include:
Armenakan-Democratic Liberal Party
Democratic Liberal Party of Armenia
Democratic Liberal Party (Italy)
Democratic Liberal Party (Japan)
Democratic Liberal Party (Romania)
Democratic Liberal Party, former name of New Korea Party, South Korea

See also
 Liberal Democratic Party (disambiguation)
 Democratic Party (disambiguation)
 Liberal Party